Cari Q (born Cari Quoyeser, November 10, 1990) is an indie rock singer, songwriter, lyricist, performer, artist, voice actor, and podcaster from Houston, Texas, based in Bologna, Italy. Performing with a band and as a solo artist, Cari appeared on NPR's Soundcheck[3] with Ben Folds, was a singer with the Houston Texans cheerleaders, and sang at the 2011 NFL draft party.[4] She played at the SXSW music festival[5] [non-primary source needed] and competed on American Idol (season 11) in January 2012.

Early Life and Education 
Cari Quoyeser was born and raised in Houston, Texas. She attended Stratford High School. Cari holds a bachelor's degree in history from the University of Texas at Austin, graduating in 2013. In 2022, Quoyeser earned a Master of Business Administration from Bologna Business School.

Career
Cari began her music career as lead vocalist and rhythm guitarist for Houston-based band Suburban Warfare in early 2009. The Cari Quoyeser Band made their live performing debut at Fitzgerald's in Houston, Texas on June 25, 2010. Cari also started a solo project, Cari Q, recording her solo debut album Blueprints to Infinity in 2012 at SugarHill Recording Studios.  

In 2009, Suburban Warfare appeared on NPR's Soundcheck with Ben Folds. As a solo act, Cari Q was a showcasing artist at the SXSW Music festival in March 2010.. From 2011 to 2013, Cari performed as a singer with the Houston Texans cheerleaders, performing at the 2011 NFL draft party. 

Cari competed on American Idol (season 11) in an episode broadcast in January 2012. 

Starting in 2014, Cari Q embarked on a European tour, additionally performing multiple concerts in Israel, as well as at the 2014 Fete de la Musique in France.

From 2012 through 2018, Cari lived and performed in Austin, Texas. She played the 2015 Heart of Texas Rockfest, a showcase for unsigned local artists during the annual SXSW music festival. In 2018, Cari relocated to from Austin, Texas, to Europe — splitting time between Belfast, Northern Ireland and Bologna, Italy.

Upon graduating with her MBA in 2021, Cari joined Musixmatch as their global Artists Community Manager. In 2022, Cari Quoyeser founded the podcast The Mix, where she interviews musical acts and discusses important trends in music and technology.

Discography

Albums 
 Blueprints to Infinity (2012)
 Driftwork Sound Sessions (2019)

Singles 
 Fall of Rome (2015)
 Byzantium (2019)
 When You're Around (2020)
 Kill Me Twice (2020)
 Negev (2020)

References

External links
 CariQmusic.com

American rock songwriters
American rock musicians
1990 births
American women singer-songwriters
American women rock singers
Musicians from Houston
Writers from Houston
Living people
Musicians from Austin, Texas
21st-century American women guitarists
21st-century American guitarists
Singer-songwriters from Texas
Guitarists from Texas
21st-century American women singers
21st-century American singers